Billy the Kid is a 1964 Spanish Western film directed by León Klimovsky, written by Ángel del Castillo, S.G. Monner, and Bob Sirens and starring George Martin, Jack Taylor, Luis Induni, and Aldo Sambrell.

Cast

References

External links
 

Films directed by León Klimovsky
Spanish Western (genre) films
1964 Western (genre) films
1964 films